Jim'll Fix It is a British television series broadcast by the BBC between May 1975 and July 1994 and was devised and presented by Jimmy Savile and produced by Roger Ordish. The show encouraged children to write in a letter to Savile with a "wish" that would come true at the end of each episode, upon which the child would be granted a medal. Notable celebrity guests appearing on the show include Muhammad Ali, Tom Baker, and Peter Cushing.

Jim'll Fix It was briefly revived in 2007 as Jim'll Fix It Strikes Again and later had a television special air in 2011.

Shortly after Savile's death in 2011, allegations of child sex abuse against Savile arose relating to the television series.

Format
The show was hosted by Savile, who would "fix it" for the wishes of several viewers (usually children) to come true each week. The producer throughout the show's run was Roger Ordish, always referred to by Savile as "Doctor Magic". The standard format was that the viewer's letter, which described their wish, would be shown on the screen and read out aloud, initially by Savile, but in later series by the viewers themselves as a voice-over. Savile would then introduce the Fix, which would either have been pre-filmed on location or take place "live" in the studio. At the end, the viewer would join Savile to be congratulated and presented with a large medal with the words "Jim Fixed It For Me" engraved on it. Occasionally, other people featured in the "Fix It" (actors from well known series, for example), might also give the viewer an extra gift somehow relating to the Fix. Savile himself played no part in the filming or recording of the "fix-its", unless specifically requested as part of the letter writer's wish. Some children apparently thought that Savile's first name was "Jim'll", so some letters shown on the programme started "Dear Jim'll".

Early series saw Savile distributing medals from a "magic chair" which concealed the medals in a variety of compartments. The "magic chair" was invented by Tony Novissimo and was built for the BBC by him at his workshops in Shepherd's Bush. The chair had first appeared on Savile's earlier Saturday night TV series, Clunk, Click. The chair was later replaced by a new computer-controlled robotic "magic chair", the brainchild of Kevin Warwick, built for the BBC by his team at the University of Reading. The arm for the chair was an RTX robotic arm, designed by Roy Levell at Universal Machine Intelligence in Wandsworth around 1985.

Internally, the BBC were concerned that the show was providing excessive product placement for corporations. Eighteen years after the show ceased airing, allegations of child sex abuse were made against Savile (who by then had died), including claims that special episodes of Jim'll Fix It were devised by Savile in order to gain access to victims.

Notable "Fix-its"
In 1976 Muhammad Ali appeared in a fix.

The Fourth Doctor, Tom Baker, appeared in the second episode, where he tore off and handed away the frayed ends of his scarf to girls visiting the studio. Ten years later, a young Doctor Who fan, Gareth Jenkins, was able to take part in a short adventure titled A Fix with Sontarans with Colin Baker and Janet Fielding.

Veteran actor Peter Cushing wrote to the show in 1986 to ask if a variety of rose could be named after his late wife; the 'Helen Cushing Rose' was the result.

In the 1980s a young boy called Dom Lawson, who now works for Kerrang! and Metal Hammer magazines, got his wish to be Iron Maiden's tech for the day and meet the band. The incident was described in Iron Maiden's A Matter of Life and Death tour book, where Dom Lawson speaks about Iron Maiden and his history on the band.

2007 revival (Jim'll Fix It Strikes Again)
This new series saw the return of Savile and began on 5 April 2007 on UKTV Gold, and was titled Jim'll Fix It Strikes Again. The series showed classic moments from the original shows, and attempted to 're-fix' it for some of the original participants.

2011 special
The BBC announced on 14 November 2011, following Savile's death, that the show would return for a one-time Christmas special on 26 December 2011, featuring Shane Richie as the programme's host. Only letters for 'fix-its' from children under 14 were eligible for the revived format. Lewis Hamilton guest-starred in this episode, as well as Girls Aloud member Kimberley Walsh and opera singer Alfie Boe.

Theme song
The theme song was sung by voice-over artist Lynda Hayes. The closing theme was sung by the group Good Looks (featuring Lavinia & Lewis Rodgers, siblings of Clodagh Rodgers) who competed in the 1982 A Song for Europe competition. Savile "fixed it" for a young viewer to perform the song with the group on an edition of the show.

Sexual abuse scandal

Claims surfaced in 2012 that Savile sexually abused some of the children who took part in Jim'll Fix It. Ordish said: "I didn't see anything and nothing was reported to me", but added that he knew Savile had a "predilection for younger females".

Transmission guide

Specials

Compilations
Series 2 Compilation: 17 April 1976
Series 3 Compilation: 26 February 1977
Series 4 Compilation: 25 March 1978
Series 5 Compilation: 24 March 1979
Series 6 Compilation: 22 March 1980
Children in Need Compilation: 23 November 1984
Series 13 Compilation: 27 August 1988
Series 14 Compilation: 28 August 1989
Series 15 Compilation: 25 August 1990
Series 16 Compilation: 24 August 1991
Series 17 Compilation: 29 August 1992
Series 18 Compilation: 5 September 1993

References

1975 British television series debuts
1994 British television series endings
BBC children's television shows
English-language television shows
Jimmy Savile